Tasha Butts (born March 10, 1982) is an American retired women's basketball player from Milledgeville, Georgia, and currently an assistant coach at Georgia Tech.

Career
Drafted 20th overall by the Minnesota Lynx in the 2004 WNBA draft, she only played in the 2004 WNBA season. Over the next four years, she did have various contracts with other WNBA teams, none of which resulted in further regular season playing time. She then served as an assistant coach at Tennessee. She played basketball overseas following the 2005 NCAA season.

Tasha worked as an assistant coach at Duquesne University. She left there to serve as an assistant coach at the University of California, Los Angeles.

From 2011 to 2019, she was an assistant coach at Louisiana State University and now serves as an assistant coach at Georgia Tech.

Career statistics

College
Source

WNBA

Source

Regular season

|-
| style="text-align:left;"| 2004
| style="text-align:left;"| Minnesota
| 30 || 0 || 14.1 || .300 || .270 || .720 || 2.1 || 0.8 || 0.4 || 0.2 || 0.8 || 2.5
|-
| align="left" | Career
| align="left" | 1 year, 1 team
| 30 || 0 || 14.1 || .300 || .270 || .720 || 2.1 || 0.8 || 0.4 || 0.2 || 0.8 || 2.5

Playoffs

|-
| style="text-align:left;"| 2004
| style="text-align:left;"| Minnesota
| 1 || 0 || 1.0 || .000 || .000 || .000 || 0.0 || 0.0 || 0.0 || 0.0 || 2.0 || 0.0
|-
| align="left" | Career
| align="left" | 1 year, 1 team
| 1 || 0 || 1.0 || .000 || .000 || .000 || 0.0 || 0.0 || 0.0 || 0.0 || 2.0 || 0.0

References

External links
WNBA profile

1982 births
Living people
American women's basketball coaches
American women's basketball players
Basketball players from Georgia (U.S. state)
Duquesne Dukes women's basketball coaches
Forwards (basketball)
LSU Lady Tigers basketball coaches
Minnesota Lynx draft picks
Minnesota Lynx players
People from Milledgeville, Georgia
Tennessee Lady Volunteers basketball players
UCLA Bruins women's basketball coaches